MV Cowes Castle was a car ferry operated by Red Funnel between Southampton and Cowes/East Cowes. Subsequently, sold to Jadrolinija in 1994 for further service in Croatia. She was scrapped in 2008.

Design and construction
Ordered from John I. Thornycroft & Company and built at their Woolston shipyards, she was launched, on 11 November 1965, by the  Governor of the Isle of Wight,  Lady Brabourne, daughter of Lord Mountbatten of Burma. The third member of the company's Castle class, she was an improved version of the 1962 built .

She had a bow ramp for loading at slipways at each end of the route and side doors for loading from the pontoon at Cowes.

In September 1975, it was decided to convert her and her sister ship, to drive through operation. Along with an increase in length, this increased her capacity by 25 to 30 cars. The conversion was carried out by Boele of Rotterdam and she reentered service on 15 December. She was licensed to carry a maximum of 866 passengers and 65 cars or 22 lorries.

A gate was fitted at the stern, allowing her to utilise the link span at Southampton. She would load over the stern at Southampton and over the bow at East Cowes. A bow thruster was fitted in February 1976. Before this, she occasionally had trouble berthing at Southampton in high winds and was often assisted by the small tug, Bonchurch.

History
In addition to her normal service operations, Cowes Castle undertook charter cruises, along with her sister ships. A regular event was the cruise to watch the firework display at the end of Cowes Week. She was also used as the venue for the annual general meetings of the company, moored at Royal Pier. On 16 May 1969 she was used for sightseeing cruises around Spithead for the 20th Anniversary revue of the NATO fleet by Elizabeth II.

Accidents and incidents
On 11 February 1971, arriving at Southampton in thick fog, she collided with the pontoon and ripped away one of the flotation tanks. There were no casualties but it was 30 minutes before her passengers could disembark.

Disposal
She carried out a farewell cruise to Cowes and back on 18 March and her last service trip on 21 March. She departed for Croatia on 26 March, renamed Nehaj. After 14 years further service in the Adriatic Sea she was scrapped in 2008.

References

External links
 Simplon Postcards

Ferries of England
Ferry transport on the Isle of Wight
1965 ships
Ships of Red Funnel